This is a list of characters that appear in Rudyard Kipling's 1894 The Jungle Book story collection, its 1895 sequel The Second Jungle Book, and the various film adaptations based on those books. Characters include both human and talking animal characters.

In the Mowgli stories

 Mowgli (मोगली موگلی Maogalī;  feral child) – Also referred to as "Man Cub," he is a boy who was raised by wolves, Bagheera, and Baloo.

Animals 
 Bagheera (बघीरा Baghīrā; بگھیڑا  Baghīrā, "black panther"; black panther variety of leopard) – One of Mowgli's mentors and protector.
 Baloo (भालू بھالو Bhālū, "bear"; sloth bear) – One of Mowgli's mentors and his friend. In Kipling's book, he is described as a sleepy old bear who teaches Mowgli the law of the jungle.
 Kaa (का کا Kā Indian rock python) – Mowgli's wise mentor and friend, though also feared throughout the jungle for his mesmerizing "hunger dance". He is absent in 1998's The Jungle Book: Mowgli's Story.
 Hathi (हाथी ہاتھی Hāthī "Elephant"; Indian elephant) – The chief and leader of the jungle's elephants.
 Shere Khan (शेर खान شیر خان Śēr Khān, "Tiger King" ("Khan" is a common title of Indian Muslim lordship and royalty); Bengal tiger), – A vicious man-eating Bengal Tiger who is the main villain and the archenemy of Mowgli. He is often known as "a chief among tigers" and in multiple adaptations as the one called "The King of Tigers." Despite being born with a crippled leg and derisively nicknamed "Lungri" ("The Lame One") by his own mother, Shere Khan is ruthless, aggressive, violent, arrogant, self-centered, and sees himself as the rightful lord of the jungle. 
 Seeonee Wolf Pack – An Indian wolf pack that Mowgli was raised by.
Akela (अकेला اکیلا Akēlā, "alone"; Indian wolf) – The chief and leader of the wolf pack. 
 Raksha (रक्षा رکشا Rakṣā, "protection"; Indian wolf) – Also called Mother Wolf, she is Mowgli's adoptive mother. 
 Rama (रमा رما Ramā) (Indian wolf) – Also called Father Wolf, he is Mowgli's adoptive father. 
 Grey Brother (Indian wolf) – The oldest of Father Wolf and Raksha's cubs. He appears on all Disney adaptions except for 1967's The Jungle Book, 1998's The Jungle Book: Mowgli's Story, and 2003's The Jungle Book 2.
 Leela (लीला لیلا Līlā; Indian wolf) – The granddaughter of Akela.
 Bandar-log (बन्दर-लोग بندر لوگ Bandar-lōg, "monkey-folks"; grey langurs) – A society of monkeys who are treated as pariahs for their scatterbrained anarchy. They kidnap the very young Mowgli, who is rescued by Bagheera, Baloo, and Kaa.
 Gajjini (गजिनी گجنی, ”Elephant”; Indian elephant) – Hathi’s wife. She is named Winifred in the animated Disney movie adaptation.
 Hathi Jr. (छोटा हाथी چھوٹا ہاتھی , ”Elephant”; Indian elephant) – Hathi’s son.
 Tabaqui (तंबाकूवी  تنباکوی Taṃbākūvī; "Dish-Licking Dog"; golden jackal) – He feeds on scraps from either Shere Khan or the wolves of the Seeonee Pack. In some adaptations, he is a striped hyena. Tabaqui is a servant of Shere Khan as well as Shere Khan's spy and messenger. He is killed by Grey Brother after the Grey Brother interrogates him into admitting both what Shere Khan plans to do and where and then crushes the jackal's back in "Tiger! Tiger!". He is absent from all the Disney adaptions of The Jungle Book except 1998's The Jungle Book: Mowgli's Story, in which he is portrayed as a spotted hyena, a species only native to Africa in real life.
 Mang (मङग منگ Maṅg, "go"; bat) – A bat.
 Rama (रमा رما Ramā; water buffalo) – A large water buffalo that Mowgli herds when living with humans and rides upon during the final confrontation with Shere Khan.
 Mysa (मौसा موسا Maisā, "uncle"; water buffalo) – A water buffalo.
 Chil (चील چیل Cīl; "kite (bird)"), in earlier editions called Rann (रण Raṇ, "battle") – A kite that serves as a messenger. Depicted as a Brahminy kite in the 1989 anime series.
 Sahi (इकी اکی Ikī; Indian porcupine). In later editions, he was called Ikki.
 Tha (था تھا Thā, "He was"; Indian elephant) – The first of the elephants according to Hathi.
 Thuu (थू تھو Thū; Indian cobra) – A male blind albino cobra, also called White Hood. Mowgli gives him the derisory epithet "Thuu" (meaning "it has dried") upon discovering that the supposedly deadly cobra's fangs are in fact withered and dried up from age and disuse. A version of him appeared in the Jungle Cubs episode "The Treasure of Middle Jungle" voiced by Jim Cummings. This version is a giant Indian cobra who guards man's treasure in the Middle Jungle and his fangs drying out remain intact where a shrew exposed that fact to Baloo, Prince Louie, Shere Khan, and Kaa.
 Dholes – A pack of dholes that appear in the story "Red Dog." 
 Oo (ऊ او Ū; turtle)
 Jacala (जाचला جاچلا Jacalā, "obstacle"; Indian crocodile) – A large mugger crocodile. In "Red Dog", it is stated that Mowgli broke a knife on Jacala's back during a protracted fight with him.
 Mao (मवा موا Mavā; Indian peacock) – In earlier editions, he was called Mor (मोर مور Mōr, "peacock"). . 
 Won-Tolla (Indian wolf) – An outlier who warns Mowgli's tribe of the dholes who killed his mate and cubs. Before dying of his wounds during the fight between the dholes and Mowgli's tribe, Won-Tolla slays the dhole leader.
 Chikai (चीकै جیکے Cīkai, "squeak"; rat)
 Phao (फवा پھوا Phavā; Indian wolf) – Son of Phaona and leader of The Free People.
 Phaona (फवाना پھوانا Phavānā; Indian wolf) – Phao's father and member of The Free People.
 Ferao (फोडवा پھوڑوا Phōṛavā, "woodpecker"; scarlet woodpecker)

Humans 
The following characters are known humans.
 Messua – The wife of the richest man of the human village, who decides to adopt the wild Mowgli, believing that he is their long-lost son Nathoo.
 Messua's husband – An unnamed man, the richest man of the village.
 Nathoo (नत्थू نتھو Natthū) – The long-lost son of Messua and her husband, who has been snatched by a tiger.
 Buldeo (बलदेव بلدیو Baladēvā) – The elderly chief hunter of Messua's village. He is boastful, arrogant, greedy and superstitious, and he is furious when Mowgli, who knows what the jungle is really like, contradicts some of his own more fanciful stories about the jungle. He hopes to kill Shere Khan so he can get a substantial reward placed out as a bounty for the tiger's skin. In the 2018 adaptation, he was a British hunter called John Lockwood portrayed by Matthew Rhys. (John Lockwood Kipling was Rudyard Kipling's father). Mowgli found that he had beheaded Bhoot and shot the tusk off an unnamed elephant. During Mowgli's fight with Shere Khan, Lockwood tries to shoot Shere Khan, only for Akela to take the bullet when it was heading towards Mowgli. Lockwood himself was body-slammed by the same elephant.
 Mowgli's wife – A woman who fell in love with Mowgli and meets his old friends in the jungle.
 Mowgli's son – A son of Mowgli and his wife.

Other stories
 Rikki-Tikki-Tavi
 Rikki-Tikki-Tavi (Indian grey mongoose)
 Nag and Nagaina (Indian cobras) – Nag is the Hindi word for "cobra".
 Darzee (tailorbird) – Darzee means "tailor" in Hindi.
 Chuchundra (Asian house shrew, called a muskrat in the story) – His name is derived from "chuchunder", a term used for his species in India.
 Karait (common krait)
 The Coppersmith (coppersmith barbet)

 The White Seal
 Kotick (albino seal) – "Котик" means "seal" in Russian
 Sea Catch (adult male northern fur seal); a poem by Rudyard Kipling uses the word in a Russian-type plural form "see-catchie". 
 Matkah (female northern fur seal) - "матка" is Russian seal-hunter's word for "female seal", from Russian "мать" = "mother"
 Sea Vitch (walrus)
 Sea Cow (Steller's sea cow)
 Burgomaster Gull (species) (same as Glaucous gull)
 Limmershin, the Winter Wren

 Toomai of the Elephants
 Toomai
 Kala Nag (elephant)

 Her Majesty's Servants
 Two-Tails (elephant)
 Billy (battery-mule)
 Vixen (a small dog)

 The Undertakers
 The Jackal (Golden jackal)
 The Adjutant (Lesser adjutant stork, erroneously referred to as a crane)
 Mugger of Mugger-Ghaut (Mugger crocodile)
 The Gavial (Gharial) – The Mugger's cousin.

Films adaptations
The following characters appear in the films adaptations:

 King Louie (Disney) is an orangutan who leads the Bandar-log. In the 2016 film, he is a Gigantopithecus. He is voiced by Louis Prima in the first movie, Jim Cummings in TaleSpin, Jason Marsden in Season One of Jungle Cubs, Cree Summer in Season Two of Jungle Cubs, and Christopher Walken in the 2016 film. He never appears in the second movie.
 Flunkey (Disney) is King Louie's monkey servant and lieutenant. He is voiced by Leo De Lyon in the first film and by Jim Cummings in The Jungle Book 2.
 Buzzy, Dizzy, Flaps, and Ziggy (Disney) are four vultures who closely resemble the Beatles because of their shaggy moptop haircuts and Liverpool accents. Buzzy resembles Ringo Starr, Dizzy resembles George Harrison, Flaps resembles Paul McCartney, and Ziggy resembles John Lennon. Their song "That's What Friends Are For" was sung in the style of a barbershop quartet instead of a Beatles song. Disney was originally going to have The Beatles voice them, but John Lennon refused the offer. Buzzy was voiced by J. Pat O'Malley in the first film and by Jeff Bennett in The Jungle Book 2. Dizzy is voiced by Lord Tim Hudson in the first film and by Jess Harnell in The Jungle Book 2. Flaps is voiced by Chad Stuart in the first film and by Brian Cummings in The Jungle Book 2. Ziggy is voiced by Digby Wolfe in the first film and by Jess Harnell in The Jungle Book 2.
 Shanti (Disney, named only in The Jungle Book 2) is a girl whose song "My Own Home" lured Mowgli into the Man Village in the 1967 film. Shanti later serves as his ally/love interest in the sequel. Shanti is voiced by Darleen Carr in the first film and by Mae Whitman in The Jungle Book 2. She is inspired by the unnamed girl that Mowgli falls in love with in the original novels, as well as Mahala from the 1942 adaptation.
 Ranjan (DisneyThe Jungle Book 2) is Mowgli's adopted younger brother. He is depicted as the son of Messua and her husband. Ranjan is voiced by Connor Funk.
 Lucky (DisneyThe Jungle Book 2) is the vultures' friend who loves teasing Shere Khan as seen in The Jungle Book 2. He is voiced by Phil Collins.
 Rocky (Disney) is an Indian rhinoceros. In the earlier production of the first film, Rocky was to appear in the same scene as the Vultures where he would've been voiced by Frank Fontaine. Unfortunately, his part got scrapped. Rocky did appear in the 2016 film voiced by Russell Peters where he was among the animals observing the Water Truce. After telling Mowgli to watch himself after being backed into him upon being accidentally pricked by Ikki's quills, Rocky tells Raquel that Mowgli is a man-cub.
 Raquel (Disney 2016 film) is the daughter of Rocky the Rhino. She is voiced by Madeleine Favreau.
 Fred (Disney 2016 film) is a pygmy hog who is one of the neighbors and friends of Baloo. He was voiced by Jon Favreau, who also directed the film.
 Giant Squirrel (Disney 2016 film) is an Indian giant squirrel who is one of the neighbors and friends of Baloo. The Giant Squirrel was the one who supported Baloo's claim to Mowgli that the honey works to soothe the bee stings as he claims that it's nature's ointment where he puts it everywhere. He was voiced by Sam Raimi.
 Pangolin (Disney 2016 film) is an Indian pangolin who is one of the neighbors and friends of Baloo. No voice actor was credited for this role.
Kichi (anime adaptation) is a red panda and Mowgli's best friend.
William Boone (1994 adaptation) a British Army captain and Mowgli's enemy.
 Bhoot (Warner Bros) is an albino wolf cub and Mowgli's friend. The two of them had a falling out when Bagheera made Mowgli fail Baloo's test. Mowgli found that Bhoot was killed and beheaded offscreen by John Lockwood causing Mowgli to see that John is not a nice person. Bhoot is voiced by Louis Ashbourne Serkis.

References

 
Lists of Disney animated film characters
Lists of Disney characters
Lists of film characters
Lists of fictional animals by work
Lists of fictional animals in animation
Lists of fictional animals in literature